Jordan Smiler (born 19 June 1985) is a New Zealand rugby union player who plays as a loose forward.

Smiler was born in Palmerston North, New Zealand. He played sevens for the New Zealand and captained the Australian Sevens in 2011.

Between 2008 and 2009, Smiler made 20 appearances for Waikato in the ITM Cup.

Smiler played for Sydney's Northern Suburbs in the Shute Shield then joined the  Extended Playing Squad for the 2013 Super Rugby season.

Super Rugby Statistics

References

External links
Brumbies profile

Rugby union flankers
1985 births
Living people
New Zealand rugby union players
Male rugby sevens players
Rugby union players from Palmerston North
ACT Brumbies players
Canberra Vikings players
Waikato rugby union players
New Zealand expatriate rugby union players
New Zealand expatriate sportspeople in France
Expatriate rugby union players in France
Tokyo Sungoliath players
Toyota Industries Shuttles Aichi players